The 1983 NCAA Division III men's basketball tournament was the ninth annual single-elimination tournament to determine the national champions of National Collegiate Athletic Association (NCAA) men's Division III collegiate basketball in the United States.

Held during March 1983, the field included 32 teams and the final championship rounds were contested at Calvin College in Grand Rapids, Michigan.

Scranton defeated Wittenberg, 64–63, to claim their second national title.

Brackets

Regional No. 1

Regional No. 2

Regional No. 3

Regional No. 4

Regional No. 5

Regional No. 6

Regional No. 7

Regional No. 8

National Quarterfinals

See also
1983 NCAA Division I men's basketball tournament
1983 NCAA Division II men's basketball tournament
1983 NCAA Division III women's basketball tournament
1983 NAIA men's basketball tournament

References

NCAA Division III men's basketball tournament
NCAA Men's Division III Basketball
Ncaa Tournament
NCAA Division III basketball tournament